Ontario Street (officially in ) is an east-west artery in Montreal, Quebec, Canada. It crosses the boroughs of Ville-Marie and Mercier–Hochelaga-Maisonneuve. In the latter borough, the street becomes a mix of residential and commercial and is known as Promenade Ontario.

History
John S. Cartwright, a banker from Kingston, Ontario, and J. B. Forsyth, a local merchant, purchased and subdivided the farm of Sir John Johnson in the northern part of Faubourg Quebec. They gave the three new streets the names of three different Great Lakes: Erie, Huron, and Ontario. Ontario Street was later extended in stages toward both the east and the west. Until 1948, it was believed that the street was named after the Province of Ontario, but the discovery of the subdivision documents by a city of Montreal historian corrected that inaccuracy. Although it had been known as Ontario Street since 1842, the name was made official only in 1867.

The neighbourhoods that the street crosses, Centre-Sud and Hochelaga-Maisonneuve, fell into economic decline by the 1980s, which led to many closed businesses and a reputation for poverty and crime.

The street has long been notorious for prostitution, particularly in its eastern segment.

Since the 2010s, the street has gentrified considerably, in part from the expansion of the village on the downtown section of the street and the Promenade Ontario shopping area in Hochelaga-Maisonneuve, which becomes pedestrian in the summer.

Geography 
The main portion of Ontario Street runs from Saint-Urban Street in the west (in the Quartier des Spectacles) to slightly east of Rue Viau in Hochelaga-Maisonneuve. However, there are also small sections in Montreal-East and Pointe-aux-Trembles.

The downtown portion of the street is more urban and commercial, and the Hochelaga-Maisonneuve segment is partly residential and becomes pedestrian in the summer.

West of Saint-Urban Street, it is known as President Kennedy Avenue and is home to various hotels and condominiums. This portion of the street is named after the 35th U.S. President, John F. Kennedy.

Three green line metro stations are located on Ontario Street: Place des Arts, McGill, and Frontenac. The STM runs the 125 bus on the length of the street as well.

In popular culture
It is the subject of Bernard Adamus's Rue Ontario, a 2010 single that portrays the street generally unfavorably.

The street is also the focus of Richard Beaulieu’s Chroniques du Centre-Sud, a 2014 graphic novel.

See also
 List of memorials to John F. Kennedy
 List of buildings and monuments honoring presidents of the United States in other countries

Further reading
 Ville de Montréal. Les rues de Montréal. Répertoire historique. Montréal, Méridien, 1995, p. 360

References

Streets in Montreal
Mercier–Hochelaga-Maisonneuve
Quartier Latin, Montreal
Centre-Sud
Red-light districts in Canada